St. Joseph's Parish Shrine, Pavaratty is a Christian church located in Thrissur, Kerala, India. Located in a small town named Pavaratty, the church is popularly known as Pavaratty Palli. It is a parish of Syro-malabar traditions under the auspices of the Roman Catholic Arch-diocese of Thrissur. The fireworks connected to the grand annual feast on the third Sunday after Easter is famous.

The Indian Postal Department issues a special pictorial cancellation stamp to post offices connected to popular tourist destinations and pilgrimages in India. The postal department has provided pictorial cancellation at Pavaratty post office from 13 May 1996. Pavaratti Church is the third Christian church in Kerala to receive this honor (Malayattoor Church and Bharananganam Church are the other two churches).

History
The Pavaratty area was once under the Chittattukara Parish. Since the Chittattukara church is little far from Pavaratty, people of Pavaratty requested to extend the commencement of Tirukarma ceremonies a little. But the church officials ignored the requests, so the believers from Pavaratty decided to build a church of their own, which later became St. Joseph's Church.

The simple church structure was blessed on 13 April 1876, on a Maundy Thursday. After that, they set out to construct a permanent church building and it was completed in 1880. To accommodate more people in the church hall, in 1934, a spacious hall constructed facing the main altar from the southern side, and in 1961 another one was constructed to the Northern side. The church was renovated in 1975 and later in 2004. The altar of the church which was built in the Portuguese style of architecture, was kept unchanged during these renovations.

Geography
The church is located in Pavaratty town in Chavakkad taluk, Thrissur district, Kerala. The church is located 23 km northwest of Thrissur and 4 km south of Guruvayur. The nearest railway station is Guruvayur and the nearest airport is Kochi International Airport (59 km).

Church feast
The annual grand feast of the shrine falls on the third Sunday after Easter. It is one of the most significant church festivals of Kerala. In 2019, it was the 143rd annual festival. In 2020, the festival was cancelled due to corona prevention protocols. The fireworks connected to the annual festival celebration is also famous.

Institutions under the church

Schools
 St. Lois LP School, Venmenad (Started in 1903)
 St. Joseph's LP School, Pavaratty (started in 1908)
 St. Antony's UP School, Poovathur (Started in 1925)
 St. Mary's LP School, Puthumanassery (Started in 1925)
 Sanjoe's School of Nursing, Pavaratty (Started in 1994)

Hospitals
 Sanjoe's Parish Hospital, Pavaratty (Started in 1949)

References

Churches in Thrissur district
Syro-Malabar Catholic church buildings